Archi is a free and open-source visual-modelling and design tool for creating ArchiMate models and modelling sketches.

Archi was initially funded between 2010 and 2012 by Jisc as part of a national project aimed at supporting a programme of Enterprise Architecture in the UK higher education sector.

Since January 2013, Archi has been maintained by its creators, Phil Beauvoir and Jean-Baptiste Sarrodie.

Connection with ArchiMate and The Open Group 
Archi supports the ArchiMate 3.1 modelling language, a technical standard from The Open Group. Archi provides an open source reference implementation of ArchiMate, and is currently being used as one of the tools to implement The Open Group ArchiMate Model Exchange File Format.

Features 
 ArchiMate 3.1 model support
 Sketches
 Cross-platform
 Open Source
 Free
 Expandable using plugins

Plugins 
Those plugins are available in github:
 Grafico (Git Friendly Archi File COllection) is a way to persist an Archimate model in a collection of XML files that can be easily tracked and merged using any control version system or source code management tool, for example Git.
 Database Plugin allows to store the Archimate models in a central repository (database).
 Form Plugin: add the ability to show and update elements and relationships properties in a form.
 Specialization plugin: allow to change the icon of elements and to replace the label of elements and relationships.
 Script plugin: automates some actions (load model, generate web site, ...).
 ServiceNow Import Plugin: Download CMDB information from ServiceNow web services and convert them to Archimate elements and relationships.

References

External links 
 

Enterprise architecture
Enterprise modelling
Data modeling tools
Integrated development environments
Web service development tools